Homes for the Homeless (HFH) is a 501(c)3 private, non-profit organization which provides housing and employment training for families and homeless people in New York City. It was founded in 1986 through a collaboration with Leonard N. Stern, the Cathedral of St. John the Divine, and the city of New York. Homes for the Homeless has adopted a family-based, child-centered, education-focused approach to its programming that aims to break the cycle of poverty, foster positive identities, and promote future success while allowing kids to grow, experience, and learn as kids do.

During the period 1986 to 1991, the organization sheltered hundreds of families in New York in some of the largest homeless shelters in the United States.

As of 2019, the group continues maintain smaller homeless shelters, under contract from the City, in the Bronx and Queens.

References

External links
 Homes for the Homeless Official Site

1986 establishments in New York City
Homelessness charities
Organizations based in New York City
Housing in New York City